The Ape Who Guards the Balance is the tenth in a series of historical mystery novels, written by Elizabeth Peters and featuring fictional sleuth and archaeologist Amelia Peabody.

Explanation of the novel's title
The book's title refers to the Egyptian god Thoth, the divine scribe who waits for the heart of the dead to be weighed on a scale and judged so that he may record its fate; Thoth is usually represented as having the head of an ibis, but also appears as a baboon or ape with the balancing scales.

Plot summary

Luxor, 1906-1907. The Emerson clan is trying to determine where to dig during the upcoming season. But before they even leave England, they encounter Sethos and foil an attempt to kidnap Amelia. Suspicion for the attempt falls on Sethos, but not everyone is sure.

Upon arriving in Egypt, the children, Nefret, Ramses and David, now in their early twenties but still children to Amelia and Emerson, acquire a magnificent papyrus, but are also stalked. Is Sethos behind this too?

Since Emerson has managed to annoy M. Maspero to the point of distraction, he is initially not even allowed near the Valley of the Kings, where another of Emerson’s rivals and targets of invective, Theodore M. Davis, has the rights to the entire valley. Much to everyone’s surprise (and possibly with Nefret’s help), Emerson is granted permission by Davis to clean up three tombs thought to be already excavated in full, KV3, KV4 and KV5.

Not only does his rival Davis find yet another rich tomb, right next to the debris-filled and empty tomb he excavates, once again somebody is still after the Emersons—particularly, it seems, Amelia. But help is on the way, from surprising, or perhaps not so surprising, quarters.

Actual history
In a link to the real world of Egyptology, the greatest irony is that had Emerson continued to dig in KV5, he would have discovered a tomb complex that was far more elaborate than any ever found in Egypt. Instead, the fictional Emerson failed to uncover what the real Dr. Kent Weeks discovered in 1995, finding the most extensive tomb in the Valley of the Kings, built for the children of Ramesses II and containing over 150 rooms, many untouched for thousands of years.

Awards
The novel was nominated for an Agatha Award in the "Best Novel" category in 1998.

See also

 List of characters in the Amelia Peabody series

References

1998 American novels
Amelia Peabody
Novels set in Egypt
Fiction set in 1906
Fiction set in 1907
Avon (publisher) books